"Drifter" is a song written by Don Pfrimmer and Archie Jordan, and recorded by American country music artist Sylvia.  It was released in January 1981 as the third single and title track from the album Drifter.  The song was Sylvia's fourth country hit and the first of two number one songs on the country chart.  The single went to number one for one week and spent eleven weeks on the country chart.

Content
The song focuses on a woman left with feelings for a drifting cowboy.

Charts

References

1981 songs
Sylvia (singer) songs
1981 singles
RCA Records singles
Songs written by Don Pfrimmer
Songs written by Archie Jordan
Song recordings produced by Tom Collins (record producer)